Nkami is a Guang language of Ghana. There is reported to be a community in Benin as well.

References

External links 
 ELAR archive of Documentation of Nkami

Guang languages
Languages of Ghana